The 3rd Division is the fourth tier of the Danish football league system since the 2021–22 season. It is a semi-professional association football league for men. It is organised by the Divisionsforeningen on behalf of the Danish Football Association (DBU) as part of the nationwide football competitions and is positioned between the third-tier 2nd Division and the fifth-tier Denmark Series in the league pyramid.

History 
In 2020, the Danish Football Association announced the creation of one new division, which would split the existing third tier 2nd Division in two, creating a new fourth tier: the 3rd Division. Therefore, it replaced the Denmark Series as the fourth tier, which instead became the new fifth tier.

League format 
The 3rd Division is made up of a total of 12 clubs. After 22 rounds the group will be split in a promotion group and a relegation group. The top two teams of the promotion group will be promoted to the Danish 2nd Division, while the bottom four in the relegation group are relegated to the Denmark Series.

References

 
4
Fourth level football leagues in Europe
Professional sports leagues in Denmark